Lockie Leonard is an Australian children's television series that was adapted from the Lockie Leonard books by Tim Winton. Filmed in Albany, Western Australia, the series premiere was on the Nine Network on 19 June 2007.

Lockie Leonard was produced by Goalpost Pictures Australia and is distributed by the Australian Children's Television Foundation. The theme song "Worlds Away" was performed by Jebediah.

Lockie Leonard first premiered in the UK on Jetix, airing from April 14, 2007, but would later premiere on 27 September 2008 as part of the children's Saturday morning programme TMi which airs from 09:00 to 10:30 on BBC Two. It ran for the first 12 episodes then continued to air on CBBC Channel.

The show won the 2008 TV Week Logie Award for Best Children's Series, and star Sean Keenan (Lockie) was nominated for the Graham Kennedy Award for Most Outstanding New Talent. It won the 2007 AFI award for Best Children's Drama Series. The series was also nominated for the 2007 BAFTA Awards for Best International Children's Drama Series.

Origin
The first TV series was adapted from the Lockie Leonard books, written by multi-award-winning West Australian author, Tim Winton. The three books in the series are Lockie Leonard, Human Torpedo; Lockie Leonard, Scumbuster; and Lockie Leonard, Legend. All books were distributed by Puffin International.

Overview

Series one
The premise of the series is the same as the book series from which it is derived. Lockie Leonard is a surf rat who moves with his family to Angelus, a small coastal town in Western Australia. Lockie has to deal with starting high school in a new town with no friends and a house that is in danger of sinking into a swamp. After Lockie "nuts himself smacko in the goolies" (has an accident in which his surfboard strikes him in his "tricky bits"—testicles) in the surf on his second day in town, Lockie meets a headbanger named Egg, and the two eventually become best friends. Earlier that day, while enrolling at his new school, Lockie falls in love for the first time with Vicki Streeton, the smartest and richest girl in the entire school, whose father also happens to be the mayor of Angelus. The first series is spread over Lockie's first year spent in Angelus with his family.

Series two 
The second series follows Lockie Leonard's second year in Angelus, middle of nowhere, where Lockie must cope with new situations. Vicki leaves to go to boarding school, and Lockie makes friends with new girl Mel, to whom he is initially assigned "buddy duty". His best friend Egg decides to make a new best friend in school bully, Curtis, and begins dating Vicki's friend Sasha. Lockie's brother Phillip enters Angelus High a year early owing to his impressive intelligence, and discovers a new friend or two along the way. Meanwhile, poetry-loving Sarge must deal with the new constable at the police station, and Joy decides to get out of the house and set up a new radio station, Radio Angelus.

Awards

Series 1 

 Award for Best Children's Drama 2007
 Award for Best Children's Television series 2007
 Sean Keenan won the Young Actor Award in 2007
 TV Week Logie Award for Best Children's Television series 2008

Series 2 

 Award nomination Best Children's Television Drama 2010
 Award nomination Lead Actor (Corey McKernan) 2010
 Award nomination Supporting Actor in a Television Drama (Rhys Muldoon) 2010

Cast

Main
 Sean Keenan as Lachlan 'Lockie' Leonard
 Clarence Ryan as Geoffrey 'Egg' Eggleston
 Gracie Gilbert as Victoria Anne 'Vicki' Streeton
 Briony Williams as Joy Leonard
 Rhys Muldoon as Sarge Leonard
 Corey McKernan as Phillip Leonard
 Ella Maddy as Barbara "Blob" Leonard

Recurring and guest
 Melanie Lyons (as Melanie Munt) as Lisa (Series 1)
 Mike Dorsey as Pop
 Alice Dale as Nan
 Jorden Silver as Curtis
 Tiarna Clarke as Dorothy 'Dot' Cook (Series 1)
 Trevor Jamieson as Rev. Eggleston
 Della Rae Morrison as Mrs. Eggleston (Series 1)
 Richard Mellick as Mayor Barry Streeton
 Christie Sistrunk as Mrs. Sally Streeton
 Mitchell Page as Colin 'Monster' Streeton (Series 1)
 James Beck as Josh Woodpond (Series 2)
 Laura Fairclough as Melanie 'Mel' Lamb (Series 2)
 Verity Gorman as Sasha Thompson-Baxter
 Nicholas Rechichi as Joe Ramir (Series 2)
 Cameron Findlay as Boof (Series 1)
 Ewen Leslie as John East (Series 1)
 Karli-Rae Grogan as Heidi (Series 1)
 Chanel Marriott as Kirstina (Series 2)

Episodes

Series one
(Episode information retrieved from Australian Television Information Archive).

Series two
"New and Improved"
"The X Factor"
"Bubble Trouble" 
"Pick a Winner" 
"Life Map" 
"Total Eclipse"
"The Silence of the Frogs"
"The Information Age"
"Time and Tide"
"It Happens..."
"Snake Hide Oil"
"The Big Questions"
"The Party"
"Enter the Mermaid"
"A Head of the Team"
"Cure for Stings"
"A Musical Moment"
"Laugh with the Leonards"
"Aliens in Angelus"
"Buried Treasure"
"Second Best in Show"
"I, Monster"
"Trixie Wants to Party"
"Not So Perfect Storm"
"Crimes of the Heartless"
"Legend"

Second series
The second series of Lockie Leonard was filmed in 2009 and screened in Australia on the Nine Network and WIN in 2010. The cast list remained unchanged, with new and original stories formulated by the show's writers. The new series follows a more mature Lockie's adventures and is once again set in Albany, Western Australia. The episode guide was announced online on 6 December 2009, on the Australian Television website.

The second series first screened on 17 May 2010 on Nickelodeon New Zealand, and the Nine Network in Australia on 21 August 2010, continuing weekly. In the United States, the series began airing on 21 June 2010 on Disney XD at 9:30am. In Latin America, the series premiered on Wednesday, 2 June 2010 on Boomerang. In the United Kingdom, it began airing Monday 2 August 2010 and continued daily (except on Fridays) on the CBBC channel at 11:30am.

DVD release
A DVD box set of the first series of Lockie Leonard was released in Australia in mid-August 2008, and the UK on 19 July 2010, with the second series scheduled for release in Australia on 2 March 2011 by Universal Studios, and later in 2011 by Revelation Films for the UK.

See also
 List of Australian television series

References

External links
 Lockie Leonard website – official website - web archive of this site
 Lockie Leonard Channel Nine – official Channel Nine site
 
 Lockie Leonard series 1 trailer on YouTube
 Lockie Leonard series 2 trailer on YouTube
 Lockie Leonard Series One from Revelation Films

2007 Australian television series debuts
2010 Australian television series endings
Australian comedy-drama television series
Australian children's television series
BBC children's television shows
Nine Network original programming
Television series about teenagers
Television shows set in Western Australia